Ubusuku Abukusumo is a retired American soccer defender who played professionally in Major League Soccer and the USL A-League.

Youth
In 1994, Abukusomo began his collegiate career at UNLV.  He then transferred to North Carolina State where he played on the men's soccer team in 1995 and 1996.

Professional
In 1997, he signed an MLS Project 40 contract and was assigned to the Columbus Crew on June 5.  He played sparingly for the Crew over three seasons with much of the 1998 and 1999 seasons on loan to the MLS Pro 40 team.  On November 25, 1999, the Crew waived Abukusumo.  In February 2000, the Tampa Bay Mutiny selected Abukusumo in the sixth round (sixty-fourth overall) of the 2000 MLS SuperDraft.  The Mutiny released him in pre-season.  On April 7, 2000, he signed with the Minnesota Thunder of the USL A-League.  In June, the Tampa Bay Mutiny called Abukusumo for one game.  On July 11, 2000, the Thunder traded him to the Raleigh Express for future considerations.  He finished the season in Raleigh.  He retired at the end of the season and returned to finish his college degree at the University of New Mexico.

International
In 1998, Abukusumo played for the U.S. U-23 team.

References

External links
 

1977 births
Living people
Columbus Crew players
Major League Soccer players
NC State Wolfpack men's soccer players
Minnesota Thunder players
Raleigh (Capital) Express players
Tampa Bay Mutiny players
UNLV Rebels men's soccer players
MLS Pro-40 players
A-League (1995–2004) players
Tampa Bay Mutiny draft picks
Association football defenders
American men's soccer players
University of New Mexico alumni
Soccer players from Albuquerque, New Mexico